Yaniv Luzon (born August 6, 1981) is an Israeli former footballer who played as an attacking or defending central midfielder or as a playmaker. Today, he is a manager for Hapoel Hod HaSharon.

Career
Luzon began his career with Hapoel Petah Tikva. He has also played for Maccabi Herzliya and Bnei Sakhnin. He moved to Maccabi Ahi Nazareth in 2009.

International
Luzon made seven appearances for the Israeli national team.

References

1981 births
Living people
Israeli footballers
Hapoel Petah Tikva F.C. players
Maccabi Herzliya F.C. players
Maccabi Ahi Nazareth F.C. players
Hapoel Ramat Gan F.C. players
Hapoel Hod HaSharon F.C. players
Israeli Premier League players
Liga Leumit players
Israeli people of Libyan-Jewish descent
Footballers from Hod HaSharon
Association football midfielders
Israeli football managers